The 3rd annual International Pageant of Pulchritude was held at Galveston, Texas. With 42 contestants (32 American and 10 foreign) in the pageant, 10 contestants won cash prizes and one won the grand prize, the title of "Miss Universe".

Results
Miss Chicago, Ella Van Hueson, won first place in the pageant and was crowned "Miss Universe" of 1928. Prizes included $2,000.

The second-place winner received $1,000, the third-place winner $250, and the remaining nine places received $100 each.

Placement

Contestants

International
 – Anne Koyart
 – Irene Hill
 – Nila Garrido
 – Nonni Shields
 – Raymonde Allain
 – Hella Hoffman
 – Livia Marracci
 – Anna Friedreich
 – Maria Teresa de Landa
 – Aguenda Adorna

U.S. states
 – Geraldine Grismley
 – Mildred Ellene Golden
 – Mary Deano
 – Betty Dumpres
 – Ethel Mae Frette
 – Vergie H. Hendricks
 – Evelyn Smith
 – Delores Davitt
 – Louise Fayard
 – Margaret Woods
 – Bernice Graf
 – Elizabeth K. Smith
 – Winnifred Watson
 – Mary Horlocker
 – Anna Dubin
 – Eldora Pence
 – Audrey Reilley
 – Jeannette Elizabeth (Betty) Porter

U.S. cities
 Austin – Irene Wilson
 Biloxi – Fleeta Doyle
 Chicago – Ella Van Hueson
 Milwaukee – Ida Camilla Knudson

References

International Pageant of Pulchritude
1928 in Texas
Events in Texas